Noah Georgeson is an American musician, producer, engineer, mixer and solo recording artist. Georgeson's debut album Find Shelter was released through Plain Recordings on November 28, 2006.

Early life and education 
Born in San Anselmo, California, he moved with his family to Nevada City, California at the age of three. Georgeson studied classical guitar and music composition, receiving his Bachelor of Arts degree in composition from San Francisco State University in 2001, and, with a recommendation from Terry Riley, he attended Mills College, receiving his Master of Fine Arts in 2003. While at Mills, Georgeson studied with Fred Frith, Pauline Oliveros, and Alvin Curran.

Career 
Georgeson first found popular success as a part of San Francisco band The Pleased, along with fellow member Joanna Newsom, whose debut album The Milk-Eyed Mender he produced.

Selected discography

{| class="wikitable plainrowheaders" style="text-align:center;"
|-
! scope="col" style="width:16em;" | Artist
! scope="col" | Year
! scope="col" | Album
! scope="col" | Producer
! scope="col" | Engineer
! scope="col" | Mixer
! scope="col" | Musician
|-
! scope="row"| Rodes Rollins
| rowspan="1"| 2018
| Velvet A/B Side
| 
| 
| 
| 
|-
! scope="row"| Natalia Lafourcade
| rowspan="3"| 2017
| Musas
| 
| 
| 
| 
|-
! scope="row"| iLe
| ‘’iLevitable’’
| 
| 
| 
| 
|-
! scope="row"| Marlon Williams
| Make Way For Love
| 
| 
| 
| 
|-
! scope="row"| Cate Le Bon
| rowspan="7"| 2016
| Crab Day
| 
| 
| 
| 
|-
! scope="row"| Brodka
| Clashes
| 
| 
| 
|
|-
! scope="row"| Lou Rhodes
| All the Birds
|
| 
| 
| 
|-
! scope="row"| Andy Shauf
| The Party
| 
| 
| 
| 
|-
! scope="row"| Devendra Banhart
| Ape In Pink Marble
| 
| 
| 
| 
|-
! scope="row"| ILE
| iLevitable
| 
| 
| 
| 
|-
! scope="row"| :Jinnwoo
| You Should Be Feeling This, Elliott
| 
| 
| 
| 
|-
! scope="row"| Chadwick Stokes
| rowspan="5"| 2016
| The Horse Comanche
| 
| 
| 
| 
|-
! scope="row"| Flo Morrissey
| Tomorrow Will Be Beautiful
| 
| 
| 
| 
|-
! scope="row"| Zavalaz
| All Those Nights We Never Met
| 
| 
| 
|
|-
! scope="row"| Joanna Newsom
| Divers
| 
| 
| 
|
|-
! scope="row"| Lena Fayre
| Is There Only One?
| 
| 
| 
|
|-
!scope="row"| Rodrigo Amarante
| rowspan="1"| 2014
| Cavalo
| 
| 
| 
| 
|-
! scope="row"| Adam Green and Binki Shapiro
| rowspan="6"| 2013
| Adam Green and Binki Shapiro
| 
| 
| 
| 
|-
! scope="row"| Devendra Banhart
| Mala
| 
| 
| 
| 
|-
! scope="row"| Harper Simon
| Division Street
|
| 
| 
|
|-
! scope="row"| My bubba
| Goes abroader
| 
| 
| 
| 
|-
! scope="row"| Lena Fayre
| Is There Only One?
| 
| 
| 
|
|-
! scope="row"| Lena Fayre
| Is There Only One?
| 
| 
| 
|
|-
! scope="row"| Charlotte Gainsbourg
| rowspan="3"| 2012
| 'Anna', Stage Whisper
|
|
| 
| 
|-
! scope="row"| Husky
| Forever So
|
|
| 
| 
|-
! scope="row"| Natalia Lafourcade
| Mujer Divina – Homenaje a Agustín Lara
| 
|
| 
| 
|-
! scope="row"| Ben Lee
| rowspan="2"| 2011 
| Deeper Into Dream"
|
|
| 
| 
|-
! scope="row"| The Strokes
| Angles
| 
| 
| 
| 
|-
! scope="row"| Adanowsky
| rowspan="4"| 2010
| Amador
|
|
| 
| 
|-
! scope="row"| Adam Green
| Minor Love
| 
| 
| 
| 
|-
! scope="row"| Joanna Newsom
| Have One On Me
| 
| 
| 
| 
|-
! scope="row"| Tamara Kaboutchek
| Full moon doll
| 
| 
| 
| 
|-
! scope="row"| Devendra Banhart
| rowspan="1"| 2009
| What Will We Be
|
|
| 
| 
|-
! scope="row"| Megapuss
| rowspan="2"| 2008
| Surfing|
|
|
| 
|-
! scope="row"| Little Joy
| Little Joy
| 
| 
| 
| 
|-
! scope="row"| Os Mutantes
| rowspan="2"| 2007
| Live at the Barbican Theatre''''
|
|
| 
| 
|-
! scope="row"| Devendra Banhart
| Smokey Rolls Down Thunder Canyon| 
| 
| 
| 
|-
! scope="row"| Mason Jennings
| rowspan="4"| 2006
| Boneclouds| 
| 
| 
| 
|-
! scope="row"| Vetiver
| To Find Me Gone|
|
|
| 
|-
! scope="row"| Bert Jansch
| Black Swan| 
| 
| 
| 
|-
! scope="row"| Noah Georgeson
| Find Shelter| 
| 
| 
| 
|-
! scope="row"| Devendra Banhart
| rowspan="2"| 2005
| Live at the Barbican Theatre'
| 
| 
| 
| 
|-
! scope="row"| Devendra Banhart
| Heard Somebody Say| 
| 
| 
| 
|-
! scope="row"| Joanna Newsom
| rowspan="2"| 2004
| The Milk-Eyed Mender|
|
| 
| 
|-
! scope="row"| Joanna Newsom
| Sprout and the Bean| 
| 
| 
| 
|-
! scope="row"| The Pleased
| rowspan="1"| 2003
| Don't Make Things| 
|
| 
| 
|-
|}

Awards and nominations

Grammy Awards

|-
| 2017 || ILE - Ilevitable - Mixer || Best Latin Rock, Urban or Alternative Album || 
|-
| 2018 || Natalia Lafourcade - Musas - Mixer || Best Latin Pop Album || 
|-
| 2019 || Natalia Lafourcade - Musas, Vol. 2 - Mixer || Best Latin Pop Album || 
|-

Latin Grammy Awards

|-

| style="text-align:center;" rowspan="4"| 2013 ||rowspan="3"|Mujer Divina – Homenaje a Agustín Lara - Producer, Engineer|| Best Alternative Music Album || 
|-
|-
|rowspan="4"| Latin Grammy Award for Best Engineered Album || 
|-
|-

|-
| style="text-align:center;" rowspan="4"| 2017 ||rowspan="2"|Musas (Un Homenaje al Folclore Latinoamericano en Manos de Los Macorinos, Vol. 1) - Mixer || Album of the Year || 
|-
| Best Folk Album || 
|-
| rowspan="1"|"Tú Sí Sabes Quererme" - Mixer|| Song of the Year || 
|-

|-
| style="text-align:center;" rowspan="4"| 2018 ||rowspan="2"|Musas (Un Homenaje al Folclore Latinoamericano en Manos de Los Macorinos, Vol. 2) - Mixer || Album of the Year || 
|-
| Best Folk Album || 

|-

Emmy Awards

|-
| style="text-align:center;" rowspan="4"|2016 || Narcos Tuyo'' - Producer, Mixer|| Primetime Emmy Award for Outstanding Main Title Theme Music || 
|-

References

External links
 Pitchfork article about Find Shelter

People from Nevada City, California
Living people
1975 births
American multi-instrumentalists
People from San Anselmo, California
San Francisco State University alumni
21st-century American singers
21st-century American male singers